Alexandra Genevieve "Zandy" Soree (born 1 August 1998) is an American-born Belgian footballer who plays as a midfielder for Afturelding of the Icelandic Besta deild kvenna and the Belgium national team.

Early life
Soree was raised in Weston, Florida and was a four-time state champion with American Heritage HS. In 2013 she attended the U.S. Youth Soccer Olympic Developmental Program.

UCF Knights
Soree played college soccer for the UCF Knights between 2016 and 2019. In her rookie year she was named to the AAC All-Rookie team and was a Second Team All-Conference selection as a senior in 2019.

Club career

Orlando Pride
Soree declared for the 2020 NWSL College Draft but was not selected. On 8 September 2020, with the 2020 NWSL season dealing with significant disruption during the COVID-19 pandemic, Soree was one of seven players signed to a short-term contract with Orlando Pride in order to compete in the Fall Series following the team's decision to loan out 11 senior players to play regularly overseas. She was named as a substitute in one matchday squad but did not make an appearance for the team.

Houston Dash
Having spent preseason on trial with Houston Dash ahead of the 2021 season, Soree was signed to a National Team Replacement contract on 5 April 2021 but did not make an appearance for the team.

Breiðablik
In September 2021, Soree joined Breiðablik of the Icelandic Úrvalsdeild. Although the 2021 domestic season had already concluded, Soree was registered for the team's squad during the 2021–22 UEFA Women's Champions League group stage. Soree played in all six games against Paris Saint-Germain, Real Madrid and Zhytlobud-1 Kharkiv as Breiðablik finished bottom of the group.

International career

Youth
Soree has dual citizenship of both the United States, her country of birth, and Belgium, her father's country of birth. She first represented Belgium in 2014 during 2015 UEFA Women's Under-17 Championship qualification, appearing in all three qualifying round group games and scoring three goals. In 2017, Soree stepped up to the under-19s, playing in double-header friendlies against Switzerland in April 207 before competing in the 2017 UEFA Women's Under-19 Championship qualification elite round. Belgium failed to qualify, finishing second in the group to eventual tournament winners Spain.

Senior
Soree made her senior debut on 19 January 2017 in a friendly against France. She didn't return to the squad until the 2019 Cyprus Women's Cup, making two appearances as Belgium finished third, beating Austria on penalties in the third-place playoff. In 2020, Soree was included in the 2020 Algarve Cup squad, making one appearance against Denmark.

Career statistics

Club
.

References

1998 births
Living people
Belgian women's footballers
Women's association football midfielders
Belgium women's international footballers
People from Weston, Florida
Soccer players from Florida
American women's soccer players
American people of Belgian descent
UCF Knights women's soccer players
Orlando Pride players
Houston Dash players
Breiðablik women's football players
Úrvalsdeild kvenna (football) players
Expatriate women's footballers in Iceland
American expatriate sportspeople in Iceland
Sportspeople from Broward County, Florida
American expatriate women's soccer players
Belgian expatriate women's footballers
Belgian expatriate sportspeople in Iceland